Justin Forwood (born 19 September 1993) is a South African professional rugby union player for French Pro D2 Soyaux Angouleme. His regular position is loosehead prop.

Rugby career

2010–2014: Youth rugby

Forwood was born and grew up in Pretoria. He attended and played first team rugby for Hoërskool Waterkloof, and was also to selected the Pretoria-based  union at the premier South African high schools rugby union competition, the Under-18 Craven Week, on two occasions – he made a single appearance at the 2010 tournament in Welkom and another one at the 2011 tournament in Kimberley.

He started their semi-final against the Sharks, scoring two tries in a 46–35 victory, and the final against , where his side fell just short, losing the match 18–22. Forwood's six tries in the competition made him the Blue Bulls' top try scorer.

Forwood was named in the  squad for the 2013 Vodacom Cup, but didn't make any appearances in the competition. In the latter half of 2013, he represented the  side in the 2013 Under-21 Provincial Championship; his first five appearances for the team all came off the bench, but he started their final four matches of the regular season, scoring a try in the first of those against .

Forwood made just four appearances for the team in the 2014 Under-21 Provincial Championship, scoring a try in their 31–10 victory over the Sharks in their penultimate match during the regular season. The team again finished in second place, but beat Western Province 20–10 in the final to win the championship.

2015–2016: Blue Bulls / UP Tuks

He made his second senior appearance during the 2016 Currie Cup qualification competition, coming on as a replacement in a 95–12 victory over Namibian side  in Pretoria.

2016: Eastern Province Kings

In August 2016, Forwood was contracted by the cash-strapped  for the 2016 Currie Cup Premier Division. He started four of their remaining six matches in a season that saw the EP Kings fail to win any of their matches to finish bottom of the log.

References

South African rugby union players
Living people
1993 births
Rugby union players from Pretoria
Rugby union props
Blue Bulls players
Eastern Province Elephants players
Southern Kings players
South African expatriate sportspeople in France
South African expatriate rugby union players
Expatriate rugby union players in France
Griquas (rugby union) players
Soyaux Angoulême XV Charente players